The 2021 USL League Two season is the 27th season of the USL League Two, the top pre-professional soccer league in the United States, since its establishment in 1995. The 2020 season was cancelled due to the COVID-19 pandemic.

The regular season started on May 5 and concluded on July 18. 75 teams participated in this season. The Southwest Division teams elected not to play due to COVID-19 concerns.

Team changes

New teams
FC Málaga City (LaGrangeville, NY)
FC Motown (Morristown, NJ)
FC Wichita
Fort Wayne FC
Kalamazoo FC
Kings Hammer FC (Covington, KY)
Little Rock Rangers
Morris Elite SC (Madison, NJ)
New Jersey Copa FC (Metuchen, NJ)
PDX FC (Portland, OR)
Real Central New Jersey (Mercer County, NJ)
Project 51O (Oakland, CA)
Round Rock SC (Round Rock. TX)
St. Louis Scott Gallagher SC (Fenton, MO)
Tampa Bay United
Toledo Villa FC

Departing teams
Cincinnati Dutch Lions
Daytona Rush SC
GPS Portland Phoenix
Louisville City FC U23
New Mexico United U23
Sarasota Metropolis FC
Sound FC
Tampa Bay Rowdies U23

Name changes
Evergreen FC to Northern Virginia FC
TFA Willamette to OVF Alliance
Treasure Coast Tritons to FC Florida U23
West Virginia Alliance FC to West Virginia United

Teams
Note: Teams lined out are on hiatus due to the COVID-19 pandemic.

Standings

Eastern Conference

Northeast Division

Mid Atlantic Division

Metropolitan Division

Central Conference

Great Lakes Division

Heartland Division

Mid South Division

Southern Conference

South Atlantic Division

Deep South Division

Southeast Division

Western Conference

Mountain Division

Northwest Division

Tie breakers
1) Head-to-head record based on total points in League games. 
2) Points Per Game = Total points won / Total games played
3) Total wins in League games.
4) Goal difference in League games. If number of games is unequal, the Game Average will be used.
5) Goals scored in League games.
6) Total points within smallest group. If number of games is unequal, then point percentage will be used.
7) Ranking based on points earned against top four group finishers. This tiebreaker will not be used if four (4) or fewer teams comprise the group. If number of games is unequal, then point percentage applies.
8) Point percentage outside / smallest division or conference in League games.
9) Total points in all regular season and Open Cup qualifying games combined. If number of games is unequal, then point percentage applies.
10) FIFA Fair Play – Team with fewest disciplinary points in League games. (If number of games is unequal, points will be divided by games played to arrive at a common basis for comparison).
11) Lottery conducted by USL League Two.

Playoffs

Bracket

USL League Two Championship 

Championship MVP: Manel Busquets (DMM)

Awards

All-League and All-Conference Teams

Eastern Conference
F: Tyler Bagley (BOS) *, Simon Becher (OCN), Amara Sesay (MAN)
M: Zemedkun Rodriguez (CSR), Conor Bradley (WCU), Okan Golge (NJC), Ryan Becher (REA)
D: Maurice Williams (NYR), Shane Bradley (WCU), Luca Mellor (WCU) *
G: Jan Hoffelner (NJC)

Central Conference
F: Cyrus Harmon (KAL) *, Jalen James (MBR), Pol Monells (TEX)
M: Manel Busquets (DMM), Daniel Barlow (KHM), Daire O’Riordan (KAL) *, Harvey Slade (FCB)
D: Jordan Skelton (DMM) *, George Proctor (FCB), Paul Efang (KAL)
G: Alejandro Chavarria (MBR)

Southern Conference
F: Alexis Ledoux (SGT), Charles Touche (LIO), Nicolas Molina (WVU) *
M: Arnaud Baron (SCU) *, Joao Gomiero (NCF) *, Gabriel Cabral (SGT) *, Daniel Oliveira (VIL)
D: Alex Henderson (SCU), Toby Sims (SCU) *, Cristobal Molina (NCF)
G: Drew Romig (SGT) *

Western Conference
F: Ivan Mykhailenko (POR), Jose Carlos González (LAN), Evan Hoover (OVF)
M: David Brog (POR), Jose Sosa (POR), Wesley Frankel (OVF), Henry Cromack (LAN)
D: Esai Easley (POR), Emory Rapaport (POR), Carter Payne (PDX)
G: Albert Escuin (LAN)

* denotes All-League player

References

External links
 USL League Two website

2021
2021 in American soccer leagues
2021 in Canadian soccer
Association football events postponed due to the COVID-19 pandemic